Hey Everybody may refer to:

 "Hey Everybody!", a 2015 song by 5 Seconds of Summer
 "Hey Everybody" (DJ Company song), 1994